Takashi Miki (born 27 April 1939) is a Japanese former javelin thrower who competed in the 1964 Summer Olympics.

References

1939 births
Living people
Japanese male javelin throwers
Olympic male javelin throwers
Olympic athletes of Japan
Athletes (track and field) at the 1964 Summer Olympics
Asian Games gold medalists for Japan
Asian Games gold medalists in athletics (track and field)
Athletes (track and field) at the 1962 Asian Games
Medalists at the 1962 Asian Games
Japan Championships in Athletics winners
20th-century Japanese people
21st-century Japanese people